Noahs Rump is a mountain in the Central New York region of New York. It is located southwest of Plainfield Center, New York.

References

Mountains of Otsego County, New York
Mountains of New York (state)